The Ocean of the Sky is an EP by American rock band the Used, released on July 9, 2013. It is available as a digital download and in compact disc format. A vinyl format was released in September 2013. It peaked at No. 20 on the alternative chart and No. 108 on the Billboard 200 chart.

Release
In July, the group played two weeks on the Warped Tour. Around this, the band surprise released The Ocean of the Sky EP on July digitally with physical copies available on the Warped Tour. The following day, a music video was released for "Iddy Biddy". On August 15, the band released a documentary on the making of the EP. On September 19, music videos were released for "Quixotica", "Thought Criminal" and "The Ocean of the Sky". Following this, the group went on a west coast US tour with support from William Control in 
October. The band then performed as part of Warped Tour Australia in November and December.

Track listing

Live debut of the songs

Personnel

Band
Bert McCracken – lead vocals, keyboards
Quinn Allman – guitar, additional vocals
Jeph Howard – bass guitar, additional vocals
Dan Whitesides – drums, additional vocals

Additional performers
Ryan Muirhead – gang vocals on "Iddy Biddy"

References

External links

The Ocean of the Sky at YouTube (streamed copy where licensed)

2013 EPs
The Used albums